Kenneth Summers is an English former professional darts player who competed in the 1980s.

Playing darts career
He competed in the 1985 BDO World Darts Championship and faced fellow Englishman and defending champion Eric Bristow in the first round. Leading 1–0 in sets and 2–0 in the second set, Summers narrowly missed double 16 for the match and Bristow eventually won the match 2-1 and went on to beat John Lowe to claim his 4th world title. He returned four years later to play in the 1989 BDO World Darts Championship but lost in the first round to Bob Anderson.

World Championship results

BDO
 1985: Last 32: (lost to Eric Bristow 1–2) (sets)
 1989: Last 32: (lost to Bob Anderson 0–3)

External links
Profile and stats on Darts Database

English darts players
Living people
British Darts Organisation players
1952 births